Elginerpetontidae is an extinct family of basal stegocephalian tetrapodomorphs which lived in Europe during the Frasnian stage of the Late Devonian epoch. It contains the genera Elginerpeton, Obruchevichthys and Webererpeton.

References 

Stegocephalians
Prehistoric vertebrate families